LATAM Cargo Chile (formerly LAN Cargo S.A.) is a cargo airline based in Santiago, Chile and the freight subsidiary of the LATAM Airlines Group. It is operating cargo flights within South America, to Europe and North America from its hubs at Miami International Airport and Arturo Merino Benítez International Airport.

It is a sister company of LATAM Cargo Brasil and LATAM Cargo Colombia.

History
The airline was formed on May 22, 1970, after the cargo and passenger business of LAN-Chile was separated.

In 1998, it was based on the original cargo divisions of LAN-Chile, Ladeco, and Fast Air Carrier. It also worked closely with the other cargo airlines in the group like ABSA Cargo Airline, Florida West International Airways and Mas Air. LAN Cargo was rebranded to LATAM Cargo Chile as part of the merger of its parent LAN Airlines with TAM Linhas Aéreas to form LATAM Airlines Group during 2016.

During the global COVID-19 pandemic, the airline flew numerous additional routes on an ad-hoc basis, especially in May 2020 and after.

Destinations

LATAM Cargo Chile operates the following as of June 2010.

Fleet

Current fleet

The LATAM Cargo Chile fleet includes the following aircraft as of March 2023:

Former fleet
As LAN Cargo, the airline previously operated the following aircraft:

See also
LATAM Chile
List of airlines of Chile

References

External links

Official website

Airlines established in 1970
Airlines of Chile
Cargo airlines
Chile
Chilean companies established in 1970